Eraclea ("Heraclea") is an opera (dramma per musica) composed by Leonardo Vinci on a libretto by Silvio Stampiglia.

It was first performed in Naples, at the Teatro San Bartolomeo on 1st October 1724.

The castrato Farinelli, then only 19 years old, sang one of his first roles in it.

Roles

Recordings 
Io gelosa non sono... Il ruscelletto amante (Flavia, act I, sc.15)
on Amate Stelle - Arias For Anna Maria Strada: Marie Lys (soprano), Abchordis Ensemble, Andrea Buccarella. Glossa, GCD923536, 2023.
Aprirti il seno (Iliso, act II, sc.4)
on Leonardo Vinci: Alto Arias: Filippo Mineccia (alto) & Francesca Cassinari (soprano), Stile galante, Stefano Aresi. Pan Classics, PC10297, 2014.
In questa mia tempesta
on Leonardo Vinci: Alto Arias: Filippo Mineccia (alto) & Francesca Cassinari (soprano), Stile galante, Stefano Aresi. Pan Classics, PC10297, 2014.

and on Max Emanuel Cencic: Arie Napoletane: Max Emanuel Cencic (countertenor), Il Pomo D'Oro, Maxim Emelyanychev. Decca, 2015.

References 

Opera seria
Italian-language operas
1724 operas
Operas by Leonardo Vinci
Operas